Sean Whelan is an Irish journalist. He is the RTÉ News and Current Affairs Washington correspondent since February 2022. He previously was the London correspondent, Europe Editor and Economics Correspondent for RTÉ News.

Career
He graduated from University College Dublin with a degree in History and Politics. He then obtained a postgraduate in journalism from the National Institute for Higher Education.

Whelan joined RTÉ in 1991 at the same time as Mark Little, Rachael English and Paul Reynolds. He worked in a number of areas, such as the Foreign Desk. He has reported from wars in Bosnia and Kosovo and on the return of Hong Kong to the People's Republic of China.

He was based in Brussels from 1999. In 2001, he became Europe Correspondent, and was appointed Europe Editor in 2003. After the resignation of George Lee as Economics Editor to begin a career in politics, Whelan became Economics Correspondent.

In March 2019, it was announced that he would succeed Fiona Mitchell as the London correspondent for RTÉ News.

On 21 January 2022, it was announced by RTÉ that Whelan would succeed Brian O'Donovan as the new Washington correspondent from February 2022.

References

External links 
 Sean Whelan's views on the Treaty of Lisbon

Living people
RTÉ newsreaders and journalists
Alumni of University College Dublin
People educated at Rockwell College
Year of birth missing (living people)